Dimethandrolone buciclate (developmental code name CDB-4386A), or dimethandrolone bucyclate, also known as 7α,11β-dimethyl-19-nortestosterone 17β-buciclate, is a synthetic anabolic–androgenic steroid (AAS) and a derivative of nandrolone (19-nortestosterone) which was developed by the Contraceptive Development Branch (CDB) of the National Institute of Child Health and Human Development (NICHD) and has not been marketed at this time. It is an androgen ester – specifically, the C17β buciclate (4-butylcyclohexane-1-carboxylate) ester of dimethandrolone (7α,11β-dimethyl-19-nortestosterone) – and acts as a prodrug of dimethandrolone in the body. Dimethandrolone buciclate is or was under investigation as a potential male contraceptive.

See also
 List of androgen esters

References

Abandoned drugs
Androgen esters
Androgens and anabolic steroids
Buciclate esters
Contraception for males
Estranes
Enones
Prodrugs
Progestogens